The suffix -shat (also transliterated as -šat) is found in Armenian toponymy. It translates as "happy; happiness" and derives from Parthian and Middle Persian šād ("happy, joyful"), ultimately from Old Persian šiyāta-.

Armenian toponyms which bear this suffix:
 Yervandashat (Eruandashat)
 Artashat (Artaxata)
 Ashtishat

References

Historiography of Armenia
shat
Armenian words and phrases
Place name element etymologies